Las Lomas may refer to:

United States
Las Lomas, California, a census-designated place in Monterey County
Las Lomas (California), a mountain range in Kings County
Las Lomas High School, Walnut Creek, California
Las Lomas, Texas, a census-designated place in Starr County
Las Lomas station, a rapid-transit station in San Juan agglomeration, Puerto Rico

Other countries
Las Lomas (Mexico City), a neighborhood of Mexico City
Las Lomas, Chiriquí, Panama
Las Lomas, Coclé, Panama
Las Lomas (Asunción), a neighborhood of Asunción, Paraguay
Las Lomas District, Piura Province, Peru